The Rivers Secondary College is a multi-campus government-funded co-educational comprehensive secondary day school, with three campuses located in the City of Lismore in the Northern Rivers region of New South Wales, Australia.

Established in 2016 through the administrative merger of Richmond River High School, Lismore High School, and Kadina High School, combined the College enrolled approximately 1,560 students in 2018, from Year 7 to Year 12, including  approximately twelve percent of whom identified as Indigenous Australians and approximately six percent of whom are from a language background other than English. The College is operated by the NSW Department of Education; and the Executive Principal of the College is Greg Smith.

See also

 List of government schools in New South Wales
 Education in Australia

References

External links 
 
 
 
 
 NSW Schools website

2016 establishments in Australia
Public high schools in New South Wales
Educational institutions established in 2016
Lismore, New South Wales